Seitseminen National Park is located in the municipalities of Ikaalinen and Ylöjärvi in Finland. The national park was established in 1982 and later expanded in 1989. The park is a typical mix of upland and lowland coniferous boreal forests of the Suomenselkä watershed region. Upland areas are dominated by closed productive stands of Norway spruce and Scots pine while lowland areas are covered by sphagnum swamp and bog areas that also contain stunted (Scots pine) and shrublike (Norway spruce). These swamp and bog areas appear to be barren due to the sparse tree densities. Parts of the park contain some of the most ancient and oldest forests that are accessible to public in Finland.

The Kovero Farm, a tenant farm established in 1859, is part of the cultural heritage area of the park.

Seitseminen National Park received the European Diploma of Protected Areas on 19 June 1996. It was valid until June 2011.

Fauna
The mires – that cover more than half of the park's area – are inhabited by black grouses, common cranes, whooper swans, wood sandpipers and northern willow grouses. The old-growth forests house hole nesters such as Eurasian pygmy owls, Ural owls, three-toed woodpeckers, red-breasted flycatchers and the Siberian flying squirrel. The emblem species and the most common species in the park is the pine marten.

See also
List of national parks of Finland
Protected areas of Finland

References

External links
 
 Outdoors.fi – Seitseminen National Park

National parks of Finland
Protected areas established in 1982
Geography of Pirkanmaa
Tourist attractions in Pirkanmaa
1982 establishments in Finland